"Breathe" is a song by British production duo CamelPhat and English DJ Cristoph featuring English singer Jem Cooke. It was released on 16 November 2018 by Pryda Presents. It reached the top 40 on the UK Singles Chart and was certified Gold by the British Phonographic Industry (BPI). It also peaked at number 21 on the US Billboard Dance Club Songs chart.

Background
Cristoph's mentor is Swedish DJ Eric Prydz, who released the song through his label Pryda Presents. In April 2019, Prydz released a remix of the track.

Track listing

Charts

Weekly charts

Year-end charts

Certifications

References

2018 singles
2018 songs
CamelPhat songs
Songs written by Mike Di Scala